Melissa Andrea Simon is an American clinical obstetrician/gynecologist and scientist whose research, teaching, clinical care and advocacy focus on health equity across the lifespan. Simon is founder and director of the Center for Health Equity Transformation (CHET) in the Feinberg School of Medicine at Northwestern University in Chicago, Illinois, and founder of the Chicago Cancer Health Equity Collaborative, a National Cancer Institute comprehensive cancer partnership led by the Robert H. Lurie Comprehensive Cancer Center of Northwestern University, Northeastern Illinois University, and the University of Illinois at Chicago.
Simon holds the positions of the George H. Gardner, MD professor of clinical gynecology., the vice-chair of clinical research in the Department of Obstetrics and Gynecology, professor of preventive medicine and medical social sciences at Northwestern University Feinberg School of Medicine, and is a member of the Robert H. Lurie Comprehensive Cancer Center.

Education 
Simon earned a bachelor's degree from the University of Chicago, a master's in public health from the University of Illinois at Chicago, and a medical degree at Rush Medical College. She completed a residency (including a chief administrative year) at Yale University New Haven Hospital, followed by a fellowship in family planning and reproductive health at Northwestern University Feinberg School of Medicine.

Career

Research 
Simon is a leader in implementation science research aimed at promoting health equity focused on diverse underserved groups and has received funding from the National Institutes of Health and foundations in support of this work. Simon's research efforts include deployment of several patient navigation initiatives designed to improve access to preventive and other health services spanning breast and cervical cancer screening, diagnostic follow up, and treatment; pregnancy; mental health; and elder well-being. Community-based participatory research provides the framework for reducing health disparities through these intervention research models.  She has received several awards and accolades for her work including the American Public Health Association (APHA) 2018 Award for Excellence.  She has been recognized by the National Academy of Medicine as a Community Health Hero.

Workforce development 
Simon has been recognized for her mentoring excellence with high school students through junior faculty by the National Science Foundation (2018 Presidential Award for Excellence in Science, Mathematics and Engineering Mentoring). Simon created and leads the first health care workforce development Massive Open Online Course, “Career 911: Your Future Job in Medicine and Healthcare.”

Government service 
Simon has served on the U.S. Preventive Services Task Force (USPSTF) since 2017. This independent, volunteer panel of 16 national experts in medicine makes evidence-based recommendations about clinical preventive services. She serves as a member of the National Academy of Medicine's Roundtable on the Promotion of Health Equity, which aims to promote health equity and eliminate health disparities by forging collaborative networks. Simon is also a member of the National Academy of Medicine's Care Culture & Decision-Making Innovation Collaborative.

Other service 
Simon serves on the board of the Metropolitan Chicago Breast Cancer Task Force, which has the mission of saving women's lives by eliminating health disparities in Illinois through the lens of breast cancer.  She also serves on the board of the Health and Medicine Policy Research Group which has the mission of promoting health equity and social justice for all people in Illinois.

Select honors and awards 

 National Academy of Medicine Community Health Hero, 2017
 National Science Foundation's Presidential Award for Excellence in Science, Mathematics and Engineering Mentoring, 2018
 American Public Health Association (APHA) Award for Excellence, 2018 
 Presidential Leadership Scholars Program, 2019

References 

Year of birth missing (living people)
Living people
American gynecologists
Northwestern University faculty
American obstetricians
University of Chicago alumni
Rush Medical College alumni
American women physicians
21st-century American physicians
American women academics
21st-century American women
Members of the National Academy of Medicine